Zapata Falls is a waterfall located in the San Luis Valley near the base of the Sangre de Cristo Mountains on Bureau of Land Management land adjacent to Rio Grande National Forest and south of Great Sand Dunes National Park and Preserve in Alamosa County, Colorado. Access to this waterfall entails a mildly steep  hike. Viewing the falls requires fording the stream and climbing rocks.

Black swifts nest near the falls, one of the few known breeding sites for this species in Colorado.

See also
Waterfalls of Colorado

References

External links

DesertUSA: Zapata Falls
Zapata Falls Tribute Site

Landforms of Alamosa County, Colorado
Waterfalls of Colorado
Tourist attractions in Alamosa County, Colorado
Cascade waterfalls